Quishuar (Quechua for Buddleja incana) is an archaeological site in Peru. It is situated in the Ancash Region, Yungay Province, in the south of the Yanama District.

References 

Archaeological sites in Ancash Region
Archaeological sites in Peru